= HD 131040 =

Star in the constellation Boötes

Observation data Epoch J2000 Equinox ICRS
- Constellation: Boötes
- Right ascension: 14^{h} 49^{m} 32.38200^{s}
- Declination: +51° 22′ 28.2117″
- Apparent magnitude (V): 6.51

Characteristics
- Evolutionary stage: main sequence
- Spectral type: F3V
- U−B color index: +0.00
- B−V color index: +0.40

Astrometry
Radial velocity (R_{v})	−6.90 km/s
Proper motion (μ)	RA: +15.592 mas/yr Dec.: +1.961 mas/yr
Parallax (π)	19.1763±0.0147 mas
Distance	170.1 ± 0.1 ly (52.15 ± 0.04 pc)
Absolute magnitude (M_{V})	+2.93

Details
Mass	1.4 M_{☉}
Radius	1.7 R_{☉}
Luminosity	5.6 L_{☉}
Surface gravity (log g)	4.12 cgs
Temperature	6,743 K
Metallicity [Fe/H]	+0.04 dex
Age	1.80 Myr

Other designations
- BD+51°1957, HD 131040, HIP 72508, HR 5537, SAO 29296

Database references
SIMBAD	data

HD 131040 is an F-type main-sequence star in the northern constellation of Boötes. It has an apparent magnitude of 6.51 and is 170 light years away.

The brightness of HD 131040 has been reported to vary slightly by 0.04 magnitudes. Radial velocity variations and an apparent over-luminosity have led to the theory that D 131040 is a spectroscopic binary.

Multiple star catalogues list a 10th-magnitude companion at an angular separation of 15.1″ along a position angle of 93°, and a 14th-magnitude companion at a separation of 62". Neither is thought to be physically associated with HD 131040, but there is a possible white dwarf 9.4" away, which is at a similar distance and has a similar proper motion.
